Wisley Airfield is a former wartime airfield located in the Parish of Ockham near Wisley in Surrey, England. Originally a grass airstrip, the runway was converted to tarmac in 1952 and used to test aircraft built at Weybridge by Vickers. Flying ceased in 1973 because the runway was too short for large aircraft and was too close to Heathrow.  All the structures on the site were removed, except for the runway, and the land was sold back to its principal former owner in 1980 for agricultural use.

Wartime promises
The land on which this airstrip was built was requisitioned in 1942 during WW2. Land was contributed mainly by the Ockham Park Estate, which at the time owned most of the Village of Ockham, Surrey. Land was taken mainly from Hyde, Stratford and Corsair farms - with land contributed by other tenants. The farm tenants vacated their houses to comply with the government's requirements.
It has been generally believed and accepted that HM Government gave an undertaking to restore the land to its pre-war condition when it was returned to its original owners.
As the land was not registered at HM Land Registry until 1981, the wartime transfers of the land and any accompanying conditions are not recorded at HM Land Registry.
However the matter was referred to in a debate in Parliament at the time the land was sold back to Lord Lytton (the inheritor of the Ockham Park Estate) in 1980 and recorded in Hansard.

Lord Nugent is recorded in Hansard as saying: "The history of the airfield is that it was originally requisitioned in wartime in 1943 for wartime purposes and from that time there has been a clear undertaking that when it was no longer required for these purposes it would be returned for its pre-war agricultural use. Over the intervening years this undertaking has been re-stated from time to time by various Government departments who have been responsible for authorising this special occupancy. The local authorities, the Surrey County Council and the Guildford Borough Council, insisted that when the property was sold back to its pre-war owner, Lord Lytton, all the buildings and hard standings, including the runway, must be removed to ensure a return to its agricultural use before the war and to preserve the general policy of conserving the green belt. More recently, after a good deal of discussion, these conditions were confirmed and a letter was sent by the Property Services Agency (PSA) on 15th November 1977 to the effect that Wisley Airfield would not be sold until both the buildings and the runway had been removed. Further letters were written in 1978 confirming this and, finally, there was a letter from the junior Minister of the Department of the Environment Mr. Ken Marks, on 6th March last year (1979) to the Dorking Member of Parliament, Sir George Sinclair, making the same confirmation. It was thus a great surprise to everybody when the axe fell on 13th July last year with a letter from the PSA stating that the sale would be made with the runway still in situ. This decision by the PSA makes the site available for future use as a commercial airport, in direct breach of all the undertakings over the previous 36 years and in direct breach of the major conservation considerations for the green belt. My noble friend Lord Onslow will deal in more detail with the particular villainies of the breach."

The full record of the debate in the House of Lords is recorded in Hansard. The Minutes of Ockham Parish Council confirm that this was the general understanding at the time.

Location filming
The site is attractive as a film location. As high ground it has superb uninterrupted views south towards the North Downs. These views form a beautiful cinematic backdrop for film makers and have the advantage of being available close to London. These vistas of unspoilt countryside helped re-create the landscape of northern France for filming of the Steven Spielberg film War Horse, which took place in October 2010.

Award-winning British film director John Boorman reconstructed a wartime suburban London street on part of the disused runway as the main film set for his autobiographical 1987 film Hope and Glory.

Future plans
In March 2010, the then-Secretary of State for Communities and Local Government, John Denham, gave permission to Wharf Land Investments to build a large composting facility on the former airfield but so far this has not been constructed. The new plant would be capable of processing 30,000 tonnes of waste per year and take up . A new road linking from the A3 Ockham roundabout would also be created to enable access. The Government approved the proposal after Surrey County Council did not record a decision within the required time. Local residents and nearby visitor attractions including RHS Garden, Wisley had raised concerns over the daily level of traffic that would visit the plant.

In 2014 plans were unveiled for a proposed new town on the green belt land of Wisley Airfield in which between 2,000 and 2,250 new homes would be built. The plans were rejected by Guildford Borough Council and a subsequent Appeal to the Planning Inspectorate also dismissed in June 2018.<GBC/15/P/00012>

In March 2020, Taylor Wimpey purchased the site for development and as of August 2020,  community consultation events are ongoing.  A Q&A document was formalised in July 2020 where the public asked questions of the developers and responses were formally recorded.  Local residents are almost unanimously opposed to development of the site.

Notes

References

External links
 Visit to Wisley Airfield — Youtube

Aircraft assembly plants in England
Airports in England
Airports in South East England
Buildings and structures in Surrey
Vickers